Ramón S. Aldea (born 13 August 1932) is a Filipino former archer. He competed in the men's individual event at the 1972 Summer Olympics.

References

External links
 

1932 births
Living people
Filipino male archers
Olympic archers of the Philippines
Archers at the 1972 Summer Olympics